Mar Thoma may refer to:

Community
Saint Thomas Christians or Mar Thoma Christians or Nasrani people of Kerala.

Institutions
Malankara Mar Thoma Syrian Church also known as Mar Thoma Church

People
Mar Thoma I, first indigenous Metropolitan of Malankara
Mar Thoma II
Mar Thoma III
Mar Thoma IV
Mar Thoma V
Mar Thoma VI
Mar Thoma VII
Mar Thoma VIII
Mar Thoma IX
Mar Thoma X
Mar Thoma XI
Mar Thoma XII
Mar Thoma XIII
Mar Thoma XIV
Mar Thoma XV
Mar Thoma XVI
Mar Thoma XVII
Mar Thoma XVIII
Mar Thoma XIX
Mar Thoma XX
Mar Thoma XXI

Title and name disambiguation pages